Ab Bar or Abbar (also Romanized as Āb Bar; also known as Obar and Ubār) is a city in the Central District of Tarom County, Zanjan province, Iran, and serves as capital of the county. At the 2006 census, its population was 4,918 in 1,358 households. The following census in 2011 counted 6,725 people in 1,991 households. The latest census in 2016 showed a population of 8,091 people in 2,494 households.

References 

Tarom County

Cities in Zanjan Province

Populated places in Zanjan Province

Populated places in Tarom County